A podiatrist is a medical professional devoted to the treatment of disorders of the foot, ankle and related structures of the leg. The term originated in North America but has now become the accepted term in the English-speaking world for all practitioners of podiatric medicine. The word chiropodist was previously used in the United States, but it is now regarded as antiquated.

In the United States, podiatrists are educated and licensed as Doctors of Podiatric Medicine (DPM). The preparatory education of most podiatric physicians — similar to the paths of traditional physicians (MD or DO) — includes four years of undergraduate work, followed by four years in an accredited podiatric medical school, followed by a three- or four-year hospital-based residency. Optional one- to two-year fellowship in foot and ankle reconstruction, surgical limb salvage, sports medicine, plastic surgery, pediatric foot and ankle surgery, and wound care is also available. Podiatrists are licensed in all fifty states, although each state has its own licensing requirements. The scope of practice may vary from state to state and residency training.

In many countries, the term podiatrist refers to allied health professionals who specialize in the treatment of the lower extremity, particularly the foot. Podiatrists in these countries are specialists in the diagnosis and nonsurgical treatment of foot pathology. In some circumstances, these practitioners will further specialise and, following further training, perform reconstructive foot and ankle surgery. In contrast, most American podiatrists complete residencies in surgical treatments of the foot and ankle.

The median annual podiatric physician salary in the United States was approximately $215,000 as of July 2022, with a wide range depending on years in practice. New podiatrists usually earn significantly less. First-year salaries around $150,000 with performance and productivity incentives are common. Private practice revenues for solo podiatrists vary widely, with the majority of solo practices grossing between $200,000 and $600,000 before overhead.

Podiatric specialties
Podiatrists treat a wide variety of foot and lower extremity conditions through nonsurgical and surgical approaches. The American Board of Podiatric Medicine (ABPM) offers a comprehensive board qualification and certification process in podiatric medicine and orthopedics. Subspecialties of podiatry include:

 Reconstructive surgery
 General podiatry
 Podiatric medicine
 Podiatric orthopedics
 Podiatric sports medicine
 High-risk wound care
 Podiatric rheumatology
 Neuropodiatry
 Oncopodiatry (podiatric oncology)
 Podiatric vascular medicine
 Podiatric dermatology
 Podoradiology
 Podiatric gerontology
 Podiatric diabetology (limb salvage and wound care)
 Podopediatrics
 Forensic podiatry

Podiatry assistant

In Australia, podiatry assistant Certificate IV in Allied Health Assistance qualification. The podiatry assistant work as a part of a podiatric medical team in both clinical and nonclinical settings. Common professional accreditation pathways to becoming a podiatric assistant include:

 Podiatric nurse
 Foot carer/nurse
 Podiatry support worker
 Podiatry technician
 Podiatry hygienist
 Foot health professional
 Podiatric surgical nurse
 Foot hygienist
 Foot health practitioner
 Podiatric medical assistant

Podiatric surgery
Podiatric surgery is concerned with the diagnosis and treatment of disorders of the foot and ankle:

 Structural deformities, including bunions, hammertoes, flat feet, high arches, and bone spurs
 Heel pain
 Nerve entrapment
 Joint degeneration and arthrosis
 Skin and nail conditions
 Congenital deformities
 Trauma, including fractures and dislocations
 Ankle fractures
 Total ankle replacements
 Total or hemi-joint replacements

Responsibilities
Podiatrists' roles include dealing with the conditions resulting from bone and joint disorders such as arthritis and soft-tissue and muscular pathologies as well as neurological and circulatory diseases.  Podiatrists are also able to diagnose and treat any complications of the above which affect the lower limb, including skin and nail disorders, corns, calluses and ingrown toenails. Foot injuries and infections gained through sport or other activities are also diagnosed and treated by podiatrists.

Education and training

Australia
Australian podiatrists complete an undergraduate degree of Bachelor of Podiatry or Podiatric Medicine ranging from 3 to 4 years of education. The first 2 years of this program are generally focused on various biomedical science subjects including anatomy, medical chemistry, biochemistry, physiology, pathophysiology, sociology and patient psychology, similar to the medical curriculum. The following two years will then be spent focusing on podiatry specific areas such as podiatric biomechanics and human gait, podiatric orthopaedics or the non-surgical management of foot abnormalities, pharmacology and prescribing, general medicine, general pathology, local and general anaesthesia, and surgical procedural techniques such as partial and total nail avulsions, matricectomy, cryotherapy, wound debridement and care, enucleation, and other cutaneous and electro-surgical procedures such as electro-desiccation, fulagaration and electrosection. Postgraduate courses in podiatric therapeutics and prescribing are required for having endorsements in scheduled medicines.

All podiatrists are required to register with Australian Health Practitioner Regulation Agency (AHPRA) prior to be licensed to practice in Australia. Registration is required annually. There is a minimum of continuing professional development (CPD) hours a podiatrist must undertake to maintain said registration.

Podiatric surgery in Australia
Podiatric surgeons are specialist podiatrists who have completed extensive, post-graduate medical and surgical training and perform reconstructive surgery of the foot and ankle. The qualifications of podiatric surgeons are recognised by Australian state and federal governments. It is an approved specialty by the AHPRA. Podiatric surgeons are included within both the Health Insurance Act and the National Health Act. The Podiatry Board of Australia recognizes 3 pathways to attain specialist registration as a Podiatric Surgeon:
Fellowship of the Australasian College of Podiatric Surgeons
Doctor of Podiatric Surgery, University of Western Australia
Eligibility for Fellowship of the Australasian College of Podiatric Surgeons

Podiatric surgical qualifications are a post-graduate speciality of the podiatric profession. Before attaining a podiatric surgical fellowship qualification, a podiatrist must complete an extensive training program, including:
Bachelor of Applied Science degree, majoring in Podiatry (4 years)
Minimum of 2 years post-graduate clinical practice
Master of Podiatry (2 years full-time university degree)
A 3-stage surgical fellowship training under supervision of the ACPS (4 to 6 years)
International residency training (usually in the UK and USA)
Demonstrated mastery of knowledge in foot and ankle surgery by passing oral and written examinations administered by the ACPS

New Zealand

Only one university, Auckland University of Technology (AUT), offers training to become a podiatrist. Podiatrists must have a Bachelor of Health Science majoring in podiatry from AUT, or an overseas qualification recognised by the Podiatrists Board of New Zealand, be registered with the Podiatrists Board of New Zealand and have a current Annual Practising Certificate.

Canada

In Canada, the definition and scope of the practice of podiatry varies provincially. For instance, in some provinces like British Columbia and Alberta, the standards are the same as in the United States where the Doctor of Podiatric Medicine (DPM) is the accepted qualification.

Quebec, too, has recently changed to the DPM level of training, although other academic designations may also register. Also in Quebec, in 2004, Université du Québec à Trois-Rivières started the first program of Podiatric Medicine in Canada based on the American definition of podiatry. In the prairie and Atlantic provinces, the standard was originally based on the British model now called podiatry (chiropody). That model of podiatry is currently the accepted model for most of the world including the United Kingdom, Australia and South Africa.

The province of Ontario has been registering Chiropodists since July 1993 (when the Ontario Government imposed a cap on new podiatrists). If a registered podiatrist from outside of Ontario relocates to Ontario they are required to register with the province and practice as a chiropodist. Podiatrists who were practising in Ontario previous to the imposed provincial cap were 'grandfathered' and allowed to keep the title of podiatrist as a subclass of chiropody. The scope of these 'grandfathered' (mostly American trained) podiatrists includes boney procedures of the forefoot and the ordering of x-rays in addition to the scope of the chiropodist.

In Ontario, podiatrists are required to have a "Doctor of Podiatric Medicine/DPM" degree (a post-baccalaureate, four-year degree), where the majority of chiropodists currently practising hold a post-secondary diploma in chiropody, although many also have some university level schooling or a baccalaureate degree in the sciences or in another field.  Podiatrists may bill OHIP for their services; chiropodists may not.  Podiatrists may "communicate a diagnosis" to their patients (or to their patients' representatives) and perform surgical procedures on the bones of the forefoot; chiropodists may do neither.

Chiropodists and podiatrists are regulated by the College of Chiropodists of Ontario, which had 594 chiropodists and 65 podiatrists registered as of 29 July 2015.

The only English-speaking Chiropody program in Canada, in which also has a working Chiropody Clinic on campus for students to treat patients under the supervision of licensed Chiropodists is The Michener Institute. According to The Michener Institute website, Chiropody is a branch of medical science that involves the assessment and management of foot and lower limb disorders. This includes the management of a wide variety of disorders, injuries, foot deformities, infections and local manifestations of systemic conditions. A Chiropodist is a primary care professional practising in podiatric medicine in Ontario that specializes in assessment, management and prevention of diseases and disorders of the foot. An essential member of the inter professional healthcare team, the Chiropodist is skilled in assessing the needs of their patients and of managing both chronic and acute conditions affecting foot and lower limb function. As a primary care provider capable of independent clinical practice, these skills are often practised independent of medical referral and medical supervision.

United Kingdom

In the UK, podiatrists usually undertake a 3-year undergraduate Bachelor of Science (Podiatry). Podiatric Surgeons usually undertake fellowships and postgraduate studies. The scope of practice of a podiatrist falls into four key categories:
 General clinics
 Biomechanics
 High-risk patient management
 Surgery.

There are two levels of surgical practice. As part of general podiatric care, podiatrists as HPC (Health Professions Council)-registered practitioners are involved with nail-and-minor-soft-tissue surgical procedures and qualified to administer local anaesthetics.

From 1 August 2012, the HPC is being rebranded to the HCPC (Health & Care Professions Council) as they are expanding their remit to include Social Workers. The old term of "State Registered" has been defunct for some time and is no longer used since the creation of the HPC.

Some podiatrists go on to develop and train as podiatric surgeons, who surgically manage bone and joint disorders within the foot. It is to this latter group (Podiatric Surgeons) that the guidelines apply. Fellowship requires a minimum of six-years postgraduate training. This includes a two- or three-year surgical residency with an approved centre. Podiatric surgeons acquire comprehensive knowledge of related subjects including pharmacology, regional anaesthetic techniques and radiographic interpretation, as well as in-depth knowledge of foot surgery. The Surgical Faculty of the College of Podiatrists has set the standards for fellowship.

In 2019, a 23% drop in podiatry students in the UK was reported. The Conference of Postgraduate Medical Deans called for full payment of their tuition fees and the introduction of a maintenance grant for healthcare students.

United States

In the United States, medical and surgical care of the foot and ankle is mainly provided by two groups of professionals: podiatrists (Doctor of Podiatric Medicine or DPM) and orthopedists (MDs or DOs).
The first two years of podiatric medical school is similar to training that either Doctors of Medicine (M.D.) or Doctors of Osteopathic Medicine (D.O.) receive, but with an emphasized scope on foot, ankle, and lower extremity. To enter a college of podiatric medicine, the student must first complete at least three years or 90 semester hours of college credit at an accredited institution. Biology, Chemistry, Organic Chemistry, Physics (all science courses require a lab) and English are among the required classes. Over 95% of the students who enter a college of podiatric medicine have a bachelor's degree. Many have also completed some graduate study. Before entering a college of podiatric medicine, the student must take the MCAT (Medical College Admissions Test); in 2019, the average MCAT for matriculants was 494.6 and 3.3 average undergraduate cGPA.
There are nine colleges of podiatric medicine in the United States. They all receive accreditation from the Council on Podiatric Medical Education, which is recognized by the U.S. Secretary of Education and the Council on Higher Education Accreditation. All of the colleges grant the degree of Doctor of Podiatric Medicine (DPM).

The four-year podiatric medical school is followed by a hospital based residency, which is hands-on post-doctoral training. Their residency model was standardized to 3-years of post-graduate training in 2011, and the residency is now known as the Podiatric Medicine and Surgery Residency (PMSR). Podiatric residents rotate through core areas of medicine and surgery. They work alongside their MD and DO counterparts in such rotations as emergency medicine, internal medicine, infectious disease, behavioral medicine, physical medicine and rehabilitation (PM&R), vascular surgery, general surgery, orthopedic surgery, plastic surgery, dermatology and podiatric surgery and medicine. Fellowship training is available after residency in such fields such as foot and ankle traumatology or limb salvage.

Upon completion of their residency, podiatrists can decide to become board certified by a number of specialty boards including the American Board of Podiatric Medicine (ABPM) and/or the American Board of Foot and Ankle Surgery (ABFAS), which are both approved by the profession's credentialing arm, the CPME, and both have been certifying podiatrists since the 1970s. Though the ABPM and ABFAS are more common, other boards not recognized by CPME are challenging the status quo confer board qualified/certified status. The American Board of Multiple Specialties in Podiatry (ABMSP) is one additional option and has been certifying podiatrists since 1998.

The DPM superseded the historical DSC (Doctor of Surgical Chiropody) degree in the 1960s.

References 

Podiatry